Rectal thermometry is taking a person's temperature by inserting a thermometer into the rectum via the anus. This is generally regarded as the most accurate means of temperature-taking, but some may consider it to be an invasive or humiliating procedure. Thus, it is often used sparingly and primarily on infants, children, or adults for whom taking an oral temperature would risk injury (e.g., an unconscious patient, a post-oral surgery patient, or a person suffering a seizure) or be inaccurate (due to recently ingested liquids or breathing through the mouth).

History
The precise history of rectal thermometry is largely unknown, but medical thermometers have long been made in a tube shape that fits into the anus. Medical literature shows the practice dating back to at least the 18th century, and it is probable that rectal thermometry was thought to be a safer alternative to oral temperature-taking, due to the use of mercury and other toxic chemicals in early thermometers.

In 1966 Time Magazine noted Near dawn every morning, a nurse walks into the hospital room, wakes the patient and subjects him to what for many remains a humiliating procedure, although it has become routine: insertion of a rectal thermometer.

As thermometry-related technology improves in the 21st century, rectal thermometry is becoming decreasingly pervasive, but it is still the preferred method for taking the temperature of infants and pets.

Use and procedure

Rectal thermometry is widely used in veterinary medicine and pediatrics, as well as by adults at home who want the most accurate possible temperature reading and overlook the invasive nature associated with the painless procedure. The thermometer tip must then be left in place until a reading can be derived, usually about 3 minutes for mercury thermometers and 1 minute for newer electronic types. It is important to remember that the normal human core temperature range measured with a rectal thermometer spans from 98.6 to 100.4 degrees Fahrenheit (37.0 to 38.0 degrees Celsius).

Rectal thermometers are often colored cherry red to differentiate them from oral or axillary thermometers, as well as have a shorter, squat, pear, or stubby bulb shape. They are not meant to be used interchangeably with other types of thermometers.

References

Medical tests
Rectum